This is a selected list of multiplayer online games which are free to play in some form without ever requiring a subscription or other payment.  Some common types are first-person shooters or multiplayer online battle arena, but could be of any genre.

Free and open-source 

These MOGs run on a non-profit basis, requiring no payment from the players.

Free to play 
These MOGs run on a for-profit basis, and do not require money from the player for an in-game advantage over other players.

See also
 List of massively multiplayer online games
 List of free massively multiplayer online games
 List of MMORPGs
 List of multiplayer browser games
 Browser game

References 

Multiplayer online games